The Saginaw Spirit are a major junior ice hockey team based in Saginaw, Michigan. They are members of the West Division of the Western Conference of the Ontario Hockey League (OHL), one of the Major Junior leagues of the Canadian Hockey League (CHL).

History
The Saginaw Spirit were born when Dick Garber, the owner of several local automobile dealerships, purchased the North Bay Centennials and moved the team to Saginaw after the 2001–02 season. Saginaw Spirit was named by an elementary school student attending Handley Elementary after a contest was held to name the new coming team.

The team traces its roots back to St. Catharines, Ontario, where it played as the Falcons, Teepees, and Black Hawks from 1943 to 1976. It won two Memorial Cup championships as the Teepees, in 1954 and 1960. In 1976, the franchise moved to nearby Niagara Falls, where it was known as the Flyers. In 1982, the team was moved again, this time to North Bay, and renamed the Centennials, where it remained until moving to Saginaw in 2002.

The Spirit have done extensive promotions in the Mid-Michigan area, increasing their fan base and season ticket-holder numbers. The Spirit have one of the highest attendance rates in the Ontario Hockey League.

After three rebuilding seasons the Spirit clinched their first playoff berth on March 2, 2006, but lost in the first round to the Guelph Storm. Led by Todd Watson, they made the playoffs the following two seasons, but lost to the division rival Sault Ste. Marie Greyhounds both times, in six games in 2007 and in four games in 2008. In 2009, the Spirit won their first playoff series since relocating to Saginaw, sweeping Guelph in four games. They were then swept in the second round by the London Knights.

On December 29, 2013, the Spirit and the Windsor Spitfires played the first ever outdoor game in Ontario Hockey League history.  The game was played at Comerica Park in Detroit, Michigan.  The Spitfires won the game 6–5 in front of a shortly lived Canadian Hockey League record of 25,749 spectators, surpassed later that night by the London Knights and Plymouth Whalers at the same venue.

Coaches
The first coach in Saginaw Spirit history was Dennis Desrosiers. He was well known to local fans, with many years of hockey experience in Michigan. As a player, he spent 10 years for the Saginaw Gears (IHL), and spent time coaching the Flint Generals, Saginaw Generals & Kalamazoo Wings all in Michigan.

List of coaches. Numbers of seasons in parentheses.

2002–03 – Dennis Desrosiers (2)
2003–04 – Dennis Desrosiers / Moe Mantha
2004–05 – Doug Lidster / Bob Mancini
2005–07 – Bob Mancini (3)
2007–11 – Todd Watson (5)
2011-12 – Todd Watson / Greg Gilbert
2012–16 – Greg Gilbert fired mid-season
2016 – Moe Mantha (interim)
2016–17  – Spencer Carbery
2017–18  – Troy Smith
2018–present – Chris Lazary

Players

Award winners
2003–04 – Patrick McNeill, Jack Ferguson Award - 1st overall OHL Priority Draft Selection
2005–06 – Ryan Daniels, F.W. "Dinty" Moore Trophy - Best Rookie GAA
2005–06 – Craig Goslin, OHL Executive of the Year
2006–07 – Tom Pyatt, William Hanley Trophy - Most Sportsmanlike Player of the Year
2006–07 – Craig Goslin, OHL Executive of the Year
2011-12 – Brandon Saad, William Hanley Trophy - Most Sportsmanlike Player of the Year
2011-12 – Greg Gilbert, Matt Leyden Trophy - Coach of the Year
2015-16 – Will Petschenig, Dan Snyder Memorial Trophy - Humanitarian of the Year

Retired numbers
89 – Vincent Trocheck

NHL alumni

Cody Bass
Paul Bissonnette
Chris Breen
T. J. Brodie
Ben Chiarot
Matt Corrente
Filip Hronek
John McFarland
Ryan McLeod
Jan Mursak
Ryan O'Marra
Jamie Oleksiak
Cole Perfetti
Geoff Platt
Dalton Prout
Tom Pyatt
Brandon Saad
Michael Sgarbossa
Mitchell Stephens
Jordan Szwarz
Chris Thorburn
Owen Tippett
Vincent Trocheck

Season-by-season results

Regular season
Legend: OTL = Overtime loss, SL = Shootout loss

Playoffs
2002–03 Out of playoffs.
2003–04 Out of playoffs.
2004–05 Out of playoffs.
2005–06 Lost to Guelph Storm 4 games to 0 in conference quarter-finals.
2006–07 Lost to Sault Ste. Marie Greyhounds 4 games to 2 in conference quarter-finals.
2007–08 Lost to Sault Ste. Marie Greyhounds 4 games to 0 in conference quarter-finals.
2008–09 Defeated Guelph Storm 4 games to 0 in conference quarter-finals.  Lost to London Knights 4 games to 0 in conference semi-finals.
2009–10 Lost to Kitchener Rangers 4 games to 2 in conference quarter-finals.
2010–11 Defeated Guelph Storm 4 games to 2 in conference quarter-finals.  Lost to Windsor Spitfires 4 games to 2 in conference semi-finals.
2011–12 Defeated Sarnia Sting 4 games to 2 in conference quarter-finals.  Lost to London Knights 4 games to 2 in conference semi-finals.
2012–13 Lost to London Knights 4 games to 0 in conference quarter-finals.
2013–14 Lost to Erie Otters 4 games to 1 in conference quarter-finals.
2014–15 Lost to Sault Ste. Marie Greyhounds 4 games to 0 in conference quarter-finals.
2015–16 Lost to Erie Otters 4 games to 0 in conference quarter-finals.
2016–17 Out of playoffs.
2017–18 Lost to Sault Ste. Marie Greyhounds 4 games to 0 in conference quarter-finals.
2018–19 Defeated Sarnia Sting 4 games to 0 in conference quarter-finals.  Defeated Sault Ste. Marie Greyhounds 4 games to 2 in conference semi-finals.  Lost to Guelph Storm 4 games to 3 in conference finals.
2019–20 Canceled.
2020–21 Canceled.
2021–22 Out of playoffs.

Uniforms and logos
The Saginaw Spirit logo depicts an American bald eagle with the colors of the Stars and Stripes along its neck, on the words "Saginaw Spirit." The uniform scheme is similar to that previously used by the U.S.A. national team. The home jerseys are white backgrounds with navy blue sleeves and red trim. The away jerseys are navy blue backgrounds with red sleeves and white trim. The Saginaw third jersey has a red background with navy blue sleeves and white trim, bearing across the chest the word "Saginaw" spelled diagonally downwards from left to right.

Mascots
Saginaw's main mascot is "Sammy Spirit," resembling an American bald eagle. The team held a vote on their website to name a new secondary mascot for the 2006–07 season. The mascot was named Steagle Colbeagle the Eagle after Stephen Colbert. Colbert had promoted the contest on his show, The Colbert Report. After naming the mascot after Colbert, the Spirit won seven straight games before losing to the Sarnia Sting on October 20. Since then, The Colbert Report had featured ongoing comedy sketches related to the team, the mascot, and other teams in the Ontario Hockey League, especially the Oshawa Generals, and Oshawa, Ontario mayor John Gray. At one game, Spirit fans threw copies of General Motors' annual report, a reference to the fact that GM, the Generals sponsor, having poor earnings at the time.  As a result of losing the game, the mayor of Oshawa created Stephen Colbert day.

Arena
The Spirit play at Wendler Arena (capacity 5,527), which is part of The Dow Event Center complex in downtown Saginaw. The OHL All-Star Classic was hosted here in 2007. This was the first time in history that the OHL All-Star Game was hosted in an American city.  The Arena was formerly home to the Saginaw Gears, Saginaw Generals, Saginaw Hawks, Saginaw Wheels and the Saginaw Lumber Kings. The general manager is local high school hockey legend Matt Blasy.
Capacity = 5,527
Ice size = 192' x 85'

Wendler Arena The OHL Arena & Travel Guide

Radio and TV
Games can be heard live on WSGW-FM (100.5 FM) with Dillon Clark on play-by-play joined by Dennis Desrosiers and Domenic Papa on color commentary.

Reruns of games can be viewed on WNEM-DT2 ("WNEM TV5 Plus"). All games can be seen live online on OHL Live.

Mid Michigan Spirit

The Saginaw Spirit in partnership with Meijer food stores sponsor the Mid Michigan Spirit, a women's hockey club based in Midland, Michigan. The 16U team took second at the MAHA state tournament during the 2006–2007 season. A 16U team moved up to 19U for the 2007–2008 season and once again took second at the MAHA state tournament in Canton, Michigan on March 9, 2008.

References

External links
www.saginawspirit.com Saginaw Spirit official site
Ontario Hockey League  Official web site
Canadian Hockey League Official web site

Ontario Hockey League teams
Ice hockey clubs established in 2002
Amateur ice hockey teams in Michigan
2002 establishments in Michigan